Chatham may refer to:

Places and jurisdictions

Canada 
 Chatham Islands (British Columbia)
 Chatham Sound, British Columbia
 Chatham, New Brunswick, a former town, now a neighbourhood of Miramichi
 Chatham (electoral district), New Brunswick, a former provincial electoral district
 Chatham Parish, New Brunswick
 Roman Catholic Diocese of Chatham, New Brunswick
 Chatham Township, Ontario, a former township
 Chatham, a community in Chatham-Kent, Ontario

England
 Chatham, Kent, a town
 Chatham railway station
 Chatham Dockyard, frequently referred to simply as "Chatham"
 Chatham Historic Dockyard, a maritime museum that occupies part of the site of Chatham Dockyard
 Chatham (UK Parliament constituency), existed 1832–1950 
 Chatham (ward), in the London Borough of Hackney
 Chatham Green, Essex

United States 
 Chatham, Alaska, known after its Chatham Seaplane Base
 Chatham, Connecticut, the name for East Hampton, Connecticut up to 1915 
 Chatham, Florida, an unincorporated community within Everglades National Park
 Chatham County, Georgia, a coastal county
 Chatham, Illinois, a village
 Chatham, Chicago, Illinois, a neighborhood
 Chatham, Iowa
 Chatham, Bracken County, Kentucky
 Chatham, Louisiana
 Chatham, Massachusetts, a town on Cape Cod
 Chatham (CDP), Massachusetts, village in the town
 Chatham, Michigan, a village
 Chatham, Mississippi
 Chatham, New Hampshire, a town
 Chatham Borough, New Jersey
 Chatham Township, New Jersey, a township that adjoins the borough
 Chatham (town), New York
 Chatham (village), New York
 Chatham County, North Carolina
 Chatham, Licking County, Ohio, an unincorporated community
 Chatham, Medina County, Ohio, an unincorporated community
 Chatham, Pennsylvania
 Chatham, Virginia, a town
 Chatham Township (disambiguation)
 Chatham Manor, a mansion in Virginia that was built between 1768 and 1771
 Chatham Square, New York City
 Chatham Strait, Alaska
 Chatham Village (Pittsburgh), Pennsylvania, a National Historic Landmark and community in Pittsburgh

Elsewhere 
 Chatham, Caerphilly, a location in Wales
 Chatham Island (Western Australia), Australia
 Chatham Island, Chile
 a former name for San Cristóbal Island, Galapagos, Ecuador
 Chatham Island (Andaman and Nicobar Islands), India
 Chatham Islands, New Zealand
 Chatham Island, New Zealand, the largest island in the group

People 
 Chatham (surname)
 Chatham Roberdeau Wheat (1826–1862), American and Confederate officer, politician, lawyer and mercenary
 William Pitt, 1st Earl of Chatham (1708–1778), British statesman, known toponymically as Chatham
 Hester Pitt, Countess of Chatham (1720–1803), wife of William Pitt
 John Pitt, 2nd Earl of Chatham (1756–1835), British statesman and general

Businesses 
 Chatham (grocer), a defunct US grocery chain in Michigan
 Chatham Motor Car Company
 Chatham Manufacturing Company
 Chatham Theatre, New York City
 The Chatham, Monte Carlo, Monaco, a bar

Schools 
 Chatham University, Pittsburgh, Pennsylvania, United States, a private university
 Chatham High School (disambiguation), various schools in the United States and one in Australia
 Chatham Grammar School for Girls, Kent, England

Ships 
 , fifteen ships of the Royal Navy
 , four ships of the U.S. Navy

Horses 
 Chatham (horse), Australian thoroughbred racehorse that raced from 1931 to 1934

Other uses 
 Raid on the Medway, also known as Battle of Chatham, a decisive Dutch naval attack during the Second Anglo-Dutch War
 CFB Chatham, Chatham, New Brunswick, Canada, a former Canadian Forces base
 Earl of Chatham, a title in the Peerage of Great Britain
 Chatham (film), directed by Daniel Adams
 Chatham Road, a road in Tsim Sha Tsui East, Hong Kong
 Chatham railway station (disambiguation)

See also 
 Chatham House, formerly the Royal Institute of International Affairs, and the Chatham House Rule named after it
 Chatham Standard Time Zone, a time zone in New Zealand, used in the Chatham Islands
 Chatham Cup, New Zealand's premier knockout association football competition